Diogo Carlos Correia Amado (born 21 January 1990) is a Portuguese professional footballer who plays as a midfielder for U.D. Leiria.

Club career

Portugal
Born in Lagos, Algarve, Amado joined Sporting CP's youth system at the age of 11. He made his senior debut in 2009–10, splitting the season between two third division clubs (both on loan), including farm team Real Sport Clube. In June, he was released.

For 2010–11, Amado joined U.D. Leiria of the Primeira Liga, making his debut in the competition on 15 August in a 0–0 away draw against S.C. Beira-Mar and appearing in exactly half of the league matches as the team finished in tenth position. In the following campaign, he was loaned to G.D. Estoril Praia in the Segunda Liga.

Sheffield Wednesday / Estoril
Amado signed a two-year contract with Sheffield Wednesday on 10 July 2012, having been recommended to manager Dave Jones by José Semedo, an ex-teammate of Amado from his Sporting youth days. However, he failed to settle and left the following month, rejoining his previous club Estoril, now in the top flight.

References

External links

1990 births
Living people
People from Lagos, Portugal
Sportspeople from Faro District
Portuguese footballers
Association football midfielders
Primeira Liga players
Liga Portugal 2 players
Segunda Divisão players
Sporting CP footballers
Real S.C. players
Odivelas F.C. players
U.D. Leiria players
G.D. Estoril Praia players
Sheffield Wednesday F.C. players
Qatar Stars League players
Al-Gharafa SC players
UAE Pro League players
Ajman Club players
Portugal youth international footballers
Portugal under-21 international footballers
Portuguese expatriate footballers
Expatriate footballers in England
Expatriate footballers in Qatar
Expatriate footballers in the United Arab Emirates
Portuguese expatriate sportspeople in England
Portuguese expatriate sportspeople in Qatar
Portuguese expatriate sportspeople in the United Arab Emirates